Disney's Hercules: The Animated Series (commonly referred to as simply Hercules) is an American animated television series based on the 1997 film of the same name and the Greek myth. The series followed Hercules as a teenager, in training to be a hero, prior to the events of the film.  

The series premiered in syndication on August 31, 1998, and on ABC through its Disney's One Saturday Morning block on September 12, 1998. The syndicated run lasted 52 episodes, while the ABC run lasted 13 episodes.

Plot
The series follows Hercules, as a teenager, training as a hero, as well as trying to adjust to life. With his free-spirited friend Icarus, his future-seeing friend Cassandra, and his trainer Philoctetes ("Phil"), he battles his evil uncle Hades. Like all teenagers, though, Hercules has to worry about peer pressure when the snobbish prince Adonis ridicules him. The series notably contradicts several events and plot points in the original film.

Episodes

Characters

A majority of the cast from the film reprised their roles for the series.
 Hercules (voiced by Tate Donovan) – The hero-in-training and the son of both Zeus and Hera, in contrast to the original myth of being half-mortal, half-god. Despite this, Hercules has been referred to as demigod throughout the series. Despite being a courageous youth in his hero training, Hercules is still an awkward teenager who clumsily goes about inadvertently destroying things or humiliating himself.
 Philoctetes (voiced by Robert Costanzo) – The satyr hero trainer who serves as Hercules's coach, his best friend and sidekick. In the series, his training with Odysseus and Achilles remains intact. When asked about teenage Hercules' time attending Prometheus Academy, Phil told Megara it wasn't the most graceful period of Herc's life, partly because of Herc's flaws from his awkward phase as well as at one point sinking Phil's island briefly. Phil is one of the few characters from the original movie whose voice actor (Danny DeVito) did not return.
 Pegasus (voiced by Frank Welker) – The winged horse "with the brain of a bird" formed from clouds by Zeus, he is the childhood pet and faithful companion of his owner Hercules.
 Icarus (voiced by French Stewart) – Hercules' best friend, the boy who escaped from a labyrinth with his father on wax wings appears as a complete nut (he was "brain-fried" by flying too close to the Sun). Despite his accident, Icarus still flies every chance he gets resulting in a few more encounters with the Sun and other perils, often requiring Hercules to rescue him. Icarus is very adaptive, hence could adjust to about every situation, except when he is very jealous and acts irrationally. He could become an ultraserious soldier at boot camp or a nearly identical version of Hades himself. Thankfully, at the end of each episode, he reverts to his own odd self. He is also completely obsessed with Cassandra and flirts with her at every opportunity he gets. His father, Daedalus (voiced by David Hyde Pierce), is a teacher in the academy and Icarus does not acknowledge his parents' divorce. When Icarus graduates, he goes into inventing with his father and makes a fortune, earning the commercial title "Icarus, the Wax-Wing King".
 Cassandra (voiced by Sandra Bernhard) – The Trojan War prophet appears as an attractive, yet antisocial girl, who has visions of the future (usually bad) once in a while, which are rarely believed. Icarus is obsessed with marrying her, though she has shown she has no reciprocation. She tolerated his presence even before Hercules joined the trio because otherwise, she would have had no friends, but even after she gained Hercules as a friend, she still continues to socialize with Icarus and even admitted to him that she considers him a good friend. After graduating, she joins the Oracle Friends Network.
 Zeus (voiced by Corey Burton) – Hercules' father and king of the gods, he is always ready to provide advice on hero work, but is often prone to mistakes and recklessness, himself.
 Hades (voiced by James Woods) – Ruler of the Underworld as well as Hercules' uncle and nemesis, he is wisecracking, devious, and hot-tempered; he constantly schemes to steal control of Mount Olympus from his brother Zeus.
 Pain and Panic (voiced by Bobcat Goldthwait and Matt Frewer) – Two tiny shapeshifting demons, they are Hades' bumbling henchmen.

Many guest stars who have ended up on the show are:

Jason Alexander
Jennifer Aniston
Tom Arnold
Ed Asner
Jim Belushi
Tia Carrere
Dan Castellaneta
Tim Conway
David Cross
Jon Cryer
Jane Curtin
Dom DeLuise
Samantha Eggar
Chris Elliott
Cary Elwes
Jon Favreau
Craig Ferguson
Will Ferrell
Miguel Ferrer
Harvey Fierstein
Brad Garrett
Sarah Michelle Gellar
Kathie Lee Gifford
Louis Gossett Jr.
Gilbert Gottfried
David Alan Grier
Blake Griffin
Merv Griffin
Linda Hamilton
Estelle Harris
Florence Henderson
Jennifer Love Hewitt
Eric Idle
Jonathan Katz
Lisa Kudrow
Jane Leeves
Eugene Levy
Vicki Lewis
Jennifer Jason Leigh
Heather Locklear
Andrea Martin
Melissa Manchester
Wink Martindale
Reba McEntire
Idina Menzel
Kathy Najimy
Wayne Newton
John O'Hurley
Cheri Oteri
Joe Pantoliano
Mandy Patinkin
Jeremy Piven
Annie Potts
Charles Nelson Reilly
Carl Reiner
Paul Reubens
RuPaul
William Shatner
Richard Simmons
Jerry Stiller
George Takei
Jeffrey Tambor
Holland Taylor
Jay Thomas
Stephen Tobolowsky
Jim Varney
Vince Vaughn
Patrick Warburton
Steven Weber
Betty White
Fred Willard
Steven Wright

Production

Development 
The series was produced by Tad Stones, who had previously produced and directed the animated television series Aladdin. The directors of Hercules, John Musker and Ron Clements, jokingly said to him while the film was being produced: "Hey, Tad, we're doing a pilot for a series". The producers decided that the irreverence of the movie would be captured more easily by setting it within the events of the movie, with Stones declaring that "by ignoring continuity and trying to stay true to the elements of humor and adventure in the film, we came up with a much stronger series that really stands on its own". Since James Woods signed to voice Hades again, along with most of the cast of the film, many big-name actors were interested in taking part on the show. Over 150 celebrities took a part in the series, some self-lampooning: Merv Griffin played a griffin talk show host, game show host Wink Martindale played a riddle-expert sphinx and Mike Connors, famous for Mannix, played Athenian policeman Chipacles (named after CHiPs).

Disney's revamping of Greek legend moved to the small screen in the late summer of 1998. Disney's Hercules had the Greek god still in "geek god" mode, before his "Zero to Hero" transformation. In the series, "Herc" was enrolled at Prometheus Academy, a school for both gods and mortals. Since events occur before young Herc meets and falls for the lovely Megara (Meg), he is joined by two new friends Cassandra (voiced by comedian Sandra Bernhard) and Icarus (voiced by French Stewart).

Animation 
The animated television series' episodes and the direct-to-video film Hercules: Zero to Hero were animated by Toon City Animation, Inc. in Manila, Philippines, Walt Disney Animation Australia, Walt Disney Animation (Japan), Inc., Walt Disney Television International Japan, Studios Basara, Tama Productions, Delta Peak Productions, Frontier Pictures, Win Wood Productions, Nakamura Productions, Wang Films Productions Co., Ltd. and Thai Wang Films Productions Co., Ltd., Hanho Heung-Up Co., Ltd., Plus One Animation, Inc., Sunmin Image Pictures Co., Ltd., Sunwoo Animation, Korea, Hana Animation, Jade Animations International Co., Ltd. and a New Zealand studio called Slightly Off Beat Productions NZ Co., Ltd. which was also based in the other countries of Seoul, Korea, Xindian District, Taipei, Taiwan and Japan.

Release

Broadcast

In 2000, Hercules moved to the now-defunct channel Toon Disney, where it continued airing until 2009. Disney XD aired the series for the first time in June 2011, when the channel launched in Canada.

Streaming
Currently, the entire series is available on Disney+, with all episodes being listed as one season.

Reception

Critical
CommonSenseMedia gave the series a rating of 4 stars out of 5, noting that this "better-than-average spinoff has heart and brawn." Calhoun Times and Gordon County News gave the series 3 stars out of 4.

Awards and nominations

|-
| 1999
| Jennifer E. Mertens, Robert Duran, Paca Thomas, Marc Perlman, Brian F. Mars, Melissa Ellis, Robbi Smith, Robert Poole III, Rick Hammel, Kenneth D. Young, Charles Rychwalski, Eric Hertsgaard, William Kean, David Lynch and Otis Van Osten
| Emmy Award for Outstanding Sound Editing – Special Class
| 
|-
| 1999
| Casey Stone for episode "Twilight of the Gods"
| Golden Reel Award for Best Sound Editing – Television Animation – Music
| 
|-
| 2000
| James Woods for playing "Hades"
| Emmy Award for Outstanding Performer in an Animated Program
| 
|-
| 2000
| French Stewart for playing "Icarus"
| Emmy Award for Outstanding Performer in an Animated Program
| 
|-
| 2000
| Marc S. Perlman, Robert Duran and Paca Thomas
| Emmy Award for Outstanding Sound Editing – Special Class
| 
|-
| 2000
| Joseph LoDuca
| ASCAP Award for Top TV Series
| 
|}

Home media
Four episodes of Hercules were reformatted into the movie Hercules: Zero to Hero and released to home video in 1999. The episode "Hercules and the Yearbook" serves as the linking narrative, with random clips replaced with the episodes "Hercules and the First Day of School", "Hercules and the Grim Avenger" and "Hercules and the Visit From Zeus". Some of the dialogue between Hercules and Meg was altered to fit the episodes.

In 2003, a further VHS tape titled Hercules: TV Series was released. It contained two episodes of the series, Hercules and the World's First Doctor and Hercules and the Secret Weapon.

References

External links

 
 
 

1990s American animated television series
1998 American television series debuts
1999 American television series endings
American children's animated adventure television series
American children's animated comedy television series
American children's animated fantasy television series
American prequel television series
Animated television shows based on films
The Disney Afternoon
Disney Channel original programming
Disney's One Too
Disney XD original programming
Hercules (franchise)
English-language television shows
First-run syndicated television programs in the United States
Greek and Roman deities in fiction
Teen animated television series
Television series about Heracles
Television series based on Disney films
Television series based on adaptations
Television series based on classical mythology
Television series by Disney Television Animation
Television series set in ancient Greece
Television series created by Tad Stones